Sareea Monaye Freeman (born October 25, 1991) is an American indoor volleyball player.

Early life
She graduated from Florida State University with a bachelor's degree in sociology.

Career
From 2009-12 she played with the Florida State University Seminoles, earning AVCA All-American Honorable Mention in 2012. She also played basketball in 2014 for Florida State. She served as assistant coach for University at Albany volleyball program in 2014.

Freeman won the 2013 Premier Volleyball League silver medal with the club Florida Wave.

She played with the Hungarian club Vasas-Óbuda Budapest for the 2013/14 season, playing the CEV Challenge Cup. Shen then played the 2014 Premier Volleyball League with Florida Wave, losing the championship match to Western Empire.

2015
Freeman played with North Texas in the 2015 Premier Volleyball League season, winning the championship and the inclusion in the all-tournament team. She moved to the Philippines, winning the 2015 Shakey's V-League 12th Season Reinforced Open Conference with PLDT Ultra Fast Hitter.

2016
She signed with the Peruvian League club Regatas Lima, winning the silver medal with that team, after losing 2-3 the final series to Universidad San Martín, winning the 1st Best Middle Blocker individual award. For the 2016 Premier Volleyball League season, she played with the club North Texas, helping them to reach the fifth place. Freeman returned to the Peruvian League with Regatas Lima.

2017
With Regatas Lima, Freeman was awarded Most Valuable Player and Best Opposite Spiker when she guided her club to the 2016/17 Peruvian league Championship over Universidad San Martín. She confessed that she felt that she had a debt with herself and that she felt comfortable with her team and head coach and was looking forward to return in 2018. She won the 2017 USA Open National Championships with Hoosier Exterminators and she was awarded all-tournament team and she praised the team work that help them achieve the winning. She joined the Thailand League club Supreme Chonburi-E.Tech for the 2017–18 season.

Clubs
  Vasas Óbuda Budapest (2013-2014)
  Florida Wave (2014)
  North Texas (2015)
  PLDT Ultra Fast Hitter (2015–2016)
  North Texas (2016)
  Regatas Lima (2016–2017)
  Hoosier Exterminators (2017)
  Supreme Chonburi (2017–2018)
  Regatas Lima (2018)
  Bring It Promotions (2018)

Awards

Individuals 
 2015 Premier Volleyball League Championship "All-Tournament team"
 2015–16 Peruvian League "1st Best Middle Blocker"
 2016–17 Peruvian League "Most Valuable Player"
 2016–17 Peruvian League "Best Opposite"
 2017 USA Open National Championships "All-Tournament team"
 2017–18 Thailand League "Best Opposite Spiker"
 2017–18 Thailand League "Most Valuable Foreign Player"
 2018 Thai-Denmark Super League "Best Spiker"

Clubs 
 2014 USA Premier Volleyball League –  Runner-Up, with Florida Wave
 2015 USA Premier Volleyball League –  Champion, with North Texas
 2015 Shakey's V-League 12th Season Reinforced Open Conference –  Champion, with PLDT Ultra Fast Hitter
 2015–16 Peruvian League –  Runner-Up, with Regatas Lima
 2016–17 Peruvian League –  Champion, with Regatas Lima
 2017 USA Open National Championships –  Champion, with Hoosier Exterminators
 2017–18 Thailand League -  Champion, with Supreme Chonburi
 2018 Thai-Denmark Super League -  Champion, with Supreme Chonburi

References

External links
 CEV Profile

1991 births
Living people
American women's volleyball players
Sportspeople from Fresno, California
Opposite hitters
African-American volleyball players
Expatriate volleyball players in Hungary
Expatriate volleyball players in the Philippines
Expatriate volleyball players in Peru
American expatriate sportspeople in Peru
Expatriate volleyball players in Thailand
American expatriate sportspeople in the Netherlands
American expatriate sportspeople in the Philippines
American expatriate sportspeople in Thailand
21st-century African-American sportspeople
21st-century African-American women
Florida State Seminoles women's volleyball players